Huankarán (possibly from Quechua wanqara a kind of drum) is an archaeological site with a rectangular tower, a couple of buildings and stone tombs (chullpa) in Peru. It is situated in the Huánuco Region, Huamalíes Province, Tantamayo District.

See also 
 Anku
Isog
Piruro
Susupillo

References 

Archaeological sites in Peru
Archaeological sites in Huánuco Region
Tombs in Peru